(When the Lord turned [the captivity of Zion]), sometimes referred to as , is a setting by Jean-Philippe Rameau of , the Latin version of Psalm 126, (thus numbered in the King James Bible, number 125 in the Latin psalters).

Composition
 is one of the four surviving church works of Rameau's early career, dating to the period 1710-1714 when he was working in Dijon or Lyon; other similar works are known to be lost. The motet is scored for soloists, choir, strings and woodwind, and includes, after the fourth verse, a verse not in the original psalm,  (Praise the name of God in song). The final verse is composed to include a fugue which, in the opinion of Reiner E. Moritz, "can stand direct comparison with ... Rameau's contemporary J. S. Bach".

Text
The Latin text is given below alongside the translation of the psalm in the King James Bible. The text in square brackets is not in the original psalm.

Recordings
William Christie (conductor), Les Arts Florissants chorus and orchestra. CD. Erato,  1995.
 William Christie (conductor), Les Arts Florissants chorus and orchestra. DVD. Opus Arte, 2006.
 Hervé Niquet (conductor), Le Concert Spirituel. CD. FNAC Music, 1983.
 Philippe Herreweghe (conductor), Paris Chapelle Royale Chorus and Ghent Collegium Vocale. CD. Harmonia Mundi, n.d.

External links

Notes and references
Notes

Sources
 Bouissou, S. and Herlin, D. (2007). Jean-Philippe Rameau : Catalogue thématique des œuvres musicales (T. 1, Musique instrumentale. Musique vocale religieuse et profane). Paris: CNRS Édition et Éditions de la BnF,
 Moritz, Reiner E. (2004). "True music is the language of the heart". Accompanying booklet to DVD recording of In convertendo, Opus Arte OA 0956D, pp. [5] - [9].
 Rameau, Jean-Philippe, ed. Camille Saint-Saëns (1898). Oeuvres Complètes, Tome 4 . Paris:Durand. Accessed on IMSLP 1 January 2015.
 Sadler, Graham (1978). "A Letter from Claude-François Rameau to J. J. M. Decroix", Music & Letters, vol. 59, no. 2 (Apr. 1978), pp. 139-147.  . 
 Sadler, Graham (1983). "Rameau: Les grands motets" (review), The Musical Times,  vol. 124, no. 1687, Sep. 1983, p. 577.  . 
 Sadler, Graham and Thomas Christensen (n.d.) "Rameau, Jean-Philippe", in Oxford Music Online, accessed 1 January 2015.

1751 compositions
Compositions by Jean-Philippe Rameau
Motets
Psalm settings